Phawlone is an ornamental turban worn by Burmese men, worn as a rolled head band with a leaf-like protrusion at the back. In the pre-colonial era, the phawlone was worn by male members of the Burmese court. In modern-day Myanmar, the phawlone is worn by boys during the shinbyu ceremony, and by Burmese dancers.

See also

Burmese clothing
Gaung baung

Burmese headgear